TSS Sir Francis Drake was a passenger tender vessel built for the Great Western Railway in 1908.

History

TSS Sir Francis Drake was built by Cammell Laird as one of a pair of vessels, with TSS Sir Walter Raleigh. She operated as a tender in Plymouth for 46 years and also sometimes at Fishguard.

She was hired to the Admiralty as a tug from 1914 to 1919. In August 1939 she was again hired to the Admiralty for use at Plymouth and later at Scapa Flow, returning to the GWR at Plymouth in 1946. She was broken up in Sutton Harbour, Plymouth, in 1954.

References

1908 ships
Passenger ships of the United Kingdom
Steamships of the United Kingdom
Ships built on the River Mersey
Ships of the Great Western Railway
Ships of British Rail